Rainbow Coast Raiders was a State Basketball League (SBL) club based in Albany, Western Australia. The club fielded a team in both the Men's SBL (MSBL) and Women's SBL (WSBL). The Raiders played their home games at Albany Sports Centre.

Club history

Men's team
1989 saw the formation of the State Basketball League (SBL) with both a men's and women's competition. A team from Albany, known as the Raiders, entered the Men's SBL for its inaugural season. They were the first team outside of Perth to enter the SBL and represented the Rainbow Coast and Great Southern region.

The Raiders missed the finals in their first three seasons before making the top eight for the first time in 1992, finishing seventh with a 12–12 record and losing 2–0 in the quarter-finals to the Cockburn Cougars. The 1993 season marked the Raiders' best ever season, as they finished third with a 17–7 record and defeated the Willetton Tigers 2–1 in the quarter-finals. They went on to lose 2–1 to the Wanneroo Wolves in the semi-finals.

The Raiders did not play finals again from 1994 onwards, folding following the 1999 season due to financial constraints.

Between 2012 and 2015, attempts were made by Albany Basketball Association to submit bids and applications for a return of the Raiders to the SBL.

Women's team
In 1992, a Raiders women's team entered the Women's SBL for the first time. In three seasons, the team amassed three wins and 57 losses.

Season-by-season results

References

Basketball teams in Western Australia
State Basketball League teams
Basketball teams established in 1989
1989 establishments in Australia
Sport in Albany, Western Australia